{{Speciesbox
| image = Opadometa fastigata at Kadavoor.jpg
| image_caption = Picture taken at Kadavoor, Kerala, India
| taxon = Leucauge fastigata
| authority = (Simon, 1877)
| subdivision_ranks = Subspecies
| subdivision = * Leucauge fastigata fastigata (Simon, 1877)
 Leucauge fastigata korinchica (Hogg, 1919)
| synonyms = * Argyroepeira fastigata (Pocock, 1900)
 Argyroepeira fastigiata (Simon, 1894)
 Argyroepeira fastuosa (Merian, 1911)
 Callinethis elegans (Thorell, 1895)
 Callinethis fastuosa (Thorell, 1890)
 Leucauge fastigata (Tikader, 1982)
 Leucauge fastigiata (Simon, 1905)
 Leucauge fastuosa (Roewer, 1938)
 Meta elegans (Thorell, 1877)
 Meta fastigata (Simon, 1877)
 Meta fastuosa (Thorell, 1877)
 Opadometa fastigata (Zhu, Song & Zhang, 2003)
 Opadometa fastigiata (Archer, 1951)
}}Leucauge fastigata'', the pear-shaped leucauge, is a species of spiders in the family Tetragnathidae (long-jawed orb weavers). It is found in India to Philippines and Sulawesi.

Members of the species have silvery or golden spots on the abdomen. They are elongated spiders with long legs and chelicerae.

They are orb web weavers, weaving small orb webs with an open hub and few, wide-set radii and spirals. The webs have no signal line and no retreat. The web is a large horizontally-placed orb structure with a diameter of more than a metre. The entire web is often suspended by several long strands of silk attached to branches and leaves nearby.

This species is separated from other Leucauge spiders by its pear-shaped abdomen and its unique fourth leg. In addition to the two rows of curved hairs (characteristic of Leucauge), this leg also has a thick brush of spines which are not present in most other species of Leucauge.

References 

 Etudes arachnologiques. 5e Mémoire. IX. Arachnides recueillis aux îles Philippines par MM. GA Baer et Laglaise. E Simon, Annales de la Société Entomologique de France, 1877
 Etudes arachnologiques. 6e Mémoire. X. Arachnides nouveaux ou peu connus. E Simon, Annales de la Société Entomologique de France, 1877

External links 
 

Tetragnathidae
Spiders of Asia
Spiders described in 1877